Rev. Theodore Martin Hesburgh, CSC (May 25, 1917 – February 26, 2015) was an American Catholic priest and academic who was a member of the Congregation of Holy Cross. He is best known for his service as the president of the University of Notre Dame for thirty-five years (1952–1987). In addition to his career as an educator and author, Hesburgh was a public servant and social activist involved in numerous American civic and governmental initiatives, commissions, international humanitarian projects, and papal assignments. Hesburgh received numerous honors and awards for his service, most notably the United States's Presidential Medal of Freedom (1964) and Congressional Gold Medal (2000). As of 2013, he also held the world's record for the individual with most honorary degrees with more than 150.

Hesburgh is credited with bringing Notre Dame, long known for its football program, to the forefront of American Catholic universities and its transition to a nationally respected institution of higher education. He supervised the university's dramatic growth, as well as the successful transfer of its ownership from Holy Cross priests to the Notre Dame board of trustees in 1967. During his tenure as president, the university also became a coeducational institution. 
In addition to his service to Notre Dame, Hesburgh held leadership positions in numerous groups involved in civil rights, peaceful uses of atomic energy, immigration reform, and Third World development. Hesburgh was also active on the boards of numerous businesses, nonprofits, civic organizations, and Vatican missions.

Early life and education
Theodore Martin Hesburgh was born on May 25, 1917, in Syracuse, New York, to Theodore Bernard Hesburgh, a Pittsburgh Plate Glass warehouse manager, and Anne Murphy Hesburgh. His father was of German ancestry; his mother's family was of Irish descent. Young Theodore was the second child and oldest son in a family of five children that included two boys and three girls. He attended Most Holy Rosary, a parochial school in Syracuse, and also served as an altar boy. Hesburgh claimed that he had wished to become a priest since the age of six. Thomas Duffy, a missionary priest from the Congregation of Holy Cross, which owned the University of Notre Dame, encouraged Hesburgh's interest in joining the priesthood.

Hesburgh graduated from Most Holy Rosary High School in Syracuse in 1934 and enrolled in the Holy Cross Seminary at Notre Dame in the fall. In 1937 his teachers decided to send the promising young seminarian to study in Rome, Italy, where he graduated from the Pontifical Gregorian University with a bachelor of philosophy degree in 1940. When the American consul in Rome ordered all U.S. citizens to leave Italy in 1940 due to the outbreak of World War II, Hesburgh returned to the United States to continue his studies. He spent three years (1940–43) studying theology at Holy Cross College and two years (1943–45) at The Catholic University of America, where he earned a doctorate in sacred theology in 1945.

On June 24, 1943, Hesburgh was ordained a priest for the Congregation of Holy Cross at Notre Dame's Sacred Heart Church (later renamed the Basilica of the Sacred Heart). Inspired by an inscription carved in stone above the church's door, Hesburgh dedicated his life to "God, Country, and Notre Dame." Afterwards, Father Ted, as he preferred to be called, returned to Washington, D.C., to complete his studies and assist at area parishes. In addition, Hesburgh served as a chaplain at the National Training School for Boys (a juvenile detention facility) and at a military installation. He also ran a large United Service Organization (USO) club in a Knights of Columbus hall in Washington, D.C. Although Hesburgh expressed an interest in serving as a chaplain in the U.S. Navy during World War II, he returned to South Bend, Indiana, in 1945, after completion of his studies in Washington, D.C., to begin a teaching career at Notre Dame.

Career

Early years
Hesburgh joined the Notre Dame faculty as an instructor in the university's Department of Religion in 1945. In 1948 Hesburgh was named head of the Department of Theology, and in 1949 Notre Dame's president, John J. Cavanaugh, C.S.C., appointed Hesburgh executive vice president. Three years later, 
at the age of thirty-five, Hesburgh succeeded Cavanaugh as president.

President of Notre Dame

Hesburgh served as Notre Dame's president for thirty-five years, from 1952 until his retirement in 1987. At that time his was "the longest presidency in American higher education." Hesburgh immediately began efforts to transform the school, primarily known for its football program, "into a nationally respected institution of higher learning." In 1953 the university created the Distinguished Professors Program to attract top scholars to Notre Dame. By the time of Hesburgh's retirement in 1987, the school had established more than a hundred distinguished professorships.

Hesburgh supervised dramatic growth at the university and expansion of its endowment, as well as its transition to a coeducational institution which occurred in 1972. During his presidency (1952–87), the annual operating budget increased from $9.7 million to $176.6 million and the university's endowment increased from $9 million to $350 million. Research funding increased from $735,000 to $15 million. Student enrollment nearly doubled from 4,979 to 9,676, and its faculty more than doubled from 389 to 951. The average faculty salary rose from $5,400 to $50,800. The number of degrees conferred annually doubled from 1,212 to 2,663. While Hesburgh was president, the university also initiated forty new building projects, including the $8 million library with the famous "Word of Life" mural, better known as "Touchdown Jesus," on its façade.

Hesburgh played a key role in developing the Land O'Lakes Statement that North American representatives of the International Federation of Catholic Universities issued in 1967. The document  outlined a commitment to academic freedom with independent governance and insisted that "a Catholic university properly developed can even more fully achieve the ideal of a true university." The statement created some controversy because it declared that Catholic universities should be autonomous, free from all authority, including the Catholic Church. Despite the conflicts that the statement initiated, Hesburg's commitment to excellence "transformed Notre Dame into one of the most recognizable and prestigious Catholic universities in the United States". In 1967, Hesburgh ended the university's exclusive, century-long leadership by the Congregation of Holy Cross clergy. Hesburgh and Howard Kenna worked together to establish a plan for transferring ownership of the university from the Congregation of Holy Cross priests to the University of Notre Dame Board of Trustees. The new governing board included laypersons and Holy Cross priests as trustees and fellows.

During the 1960s, when student demonstrations were held at colleges and universities across the United States, Hesburgh and many other collegiate presidents came under attack. For Notre Dame the climax of student unrest occurred in 1968–69. On February 17, 1969, Hesburgh took a controversial position in dealing with anti-Vietnam War student activism on campus when he issued an eight-page letter to the student body outlining the university's stance on protests. Hesburgh's letter stated that student protesters who violated the rights of others or disrupted the school's operations would be given fifteen minutes to cease and desist before facing suspension, or expulsion if they refused to disperse. Hesburgh's action provoked controversy and made national headlines. The letter was reprinted in the New York Times, the Wall Street Journal, and the Washington Post. Although Hesburgh received harsh criticism from Notre Dame's students, including requests for his resignation, responses to editorials in 250 newspapers about his "fifteen-minute rule" were nearly all favorable. In addition, President Richard Nixon sent Hesburgh a telegram praising his "tough stance" on the campus's student protests.

At President Nixon's request, Hesburgh offered advice to Vice President Spiro Agnew in a letter written on February 27, 1969, that included suggestions for potential actions that could be taken to control the violence on college campuses. Hesburgh, who generally disagreed with the Nixon administration's policy in Vietnam and favored an accelerated withdrawal of the troops, advised against repressive legislation to control campus protests. Hesburgh argued that university and college administrations should be allowed to continue to decide the appropriate action to take on their respective campuses. The National Governors Conference agreed with his view; the majority of state governors opposed the proposed legislation. In October 1969, Hesburgh publicly expressed his opposition to the war by signing a letter with other college presidents calling for withdrawal of U.S. forces from Vietnam and was present at an on-campus peace Mass with 2,500 Notre Dame students the following day.

Hesburgh, a member and later chair of the U.S. Civil Rights Commission, was publicly vocal in his support for equal rights, but he did not immediately recognize or take significant action to eliminate institutional racism at Notre Dame, where the number of black students and employees "remained at token levels until the late 1960s." In 1969, after some of Notre Dame's African American student activists criticized the low level of blacks enrolled at the university, Hesburgh appointed a student-faculty committee to assess the issue. The committee's findings caused him to take immediate measures to increase minority employment and aggressively recruit minority students. Hesburgh also persuaded the university's trustees to lift their forty-year ban on participation in postseason football games and used revenue generated from Notre Dame's bowl game appearances to fund minority scholarships. The Notre Dame Fighting Irish's win over the University of Texas Longhorns in the Cotton Bowl Classic in 1970 raised $300,000 for Notre Dame's scholarship fund.

Notre Dame, as with other colleges and universities around the country, continued to experience antiwar protests as the Vietnam War proceeded to escalate. In early May 1970, after learning of rumors that a group of students and antiwar activists planned to firebomb the Notre Dame campus's Reserve Officers' Training Corps (ROTC) building, Hesburgh responded with a public statement on May 4. In an address to a crowd of approximately 2,000 students, Hesburgh spoke against the war and objected to Nixon's decision to send troops into Cambodia. During his conciliatory remarks, Hesburgh also outlined steps that he thought the government could take to address student concerns. On May 18, Hesburgh sent a letter to President Nixon and a copy of his address, which became known as the Hesburgh Declaration. Although campus unrest caused classes to be canceled on May 6, Notre Dame's seven days of protest ended without damage, violence, or National Guard presence as it did on other college campuses, such as Columbia University, the University of California, Berkeley, and elsewhere.

By the early 1970s, Hesburgh had become the most well-known American Catholic in the United States. He continued to respond to student concerns during the 1970s and 1980s. To increase student involvement in the administration's decision-making process, Hesburgh added student representatives to university committees.

Civic and U.S. government activist

Hesburgh's career included many civic activities, as well as American and international initiatives beyond his work at Notre Dame. Hesburgh estimated he spent about 40 percent of his time off-campus and believed that his civic involvement "enriched" his priesthood.

Beginning in 1955, Hesburgh served in a number of posts on government commissions that included National Science Board and the U.S. Civil Rights Commission, and also served on the boards of non-profit organizations, such as the Rockefeller Foundation, and Vatican missions. His career included at least sixteen presidential appointments involving some of the major social issues of his era: civil rights, campus unrest, Third World development, peaceful uses of atomic energy, and immigration reform, "including the American policy of amnesty for immigrants in the mid-1980s."

Hesburgh's first presidential appointment occurred in 1954, when President Dwight Eisenhower appointed him to the National Science Board. Although Hesburgh had no previous experience as an activist supporting civil rights issues, President Eisenhower made him a member of the U.S. Civil Rights Commission in 1957, beginning fifteen years of service on the commission. Hesburgh emerged as a civil rights advocate and spokesperson for the commission. In an appendix to the commission's annual report in 1959, Hesburgh outlined his position on civil rights and equality: 

In 1961 Hesburgh persuaded the Indiana Conference of Higher Education to support a Notre Dame-based pilot project for President John F. Kennedy's new Peace Corps initiative that trained new volunteers for service in Chile, but he felt that the Kennedy administration had a poor record on civil rights issues. In contrast to his assessment of the Kennedy administration's civil rights efforts, Hesburgh praised Lyndon B. Johnson's work to secure passage of the Civil Rights Act of 1964 in the U.S. Congress and his courage for supporting the Voting Rights Act of 1965. Hesburgh also made public appearances to show his support for the civil rights movement. On July 21, 1964, Hesburgh delivered an impromptu speech during Martin Luther King Jr.'s civil rights rally in Chicago, Illinois. At the conclusion of the event, he joined hands with King and other civil rights supporters as the group sang "We Shall Overcome."

Hesburgh served as chairman of the U.S. Civil Rights Commission from 1969, when President Nixon appointed him to the leadership position, until 1972, when White House aides asked for Hesburgh's resignation. His dismissal from the commission in 1972 followed a series of disagreements between Hesburgh, the commission, and the Nixon administration about civil rights policies. Hesburgh objected to the president's slowdown policy on school desegregation, opposed Nixon's anti-busing policy, and advocated for the renewal of the Voting Rights Act, which the Nixon administration wanted to amend. Hesburgh publicly explained that he believed the primary reason for his dismissal was due to the commission's report on minority employment in government.

According to Rick Perlstein in Nixonland (2008), when Thomas Eagleton dropped out of the race as George McGovern's vice presidential running mate in the 1972 presidential election, Hesburgh was considered as a replacement candidate for Eagleton, but he declined the offer. In the 1970s, Hesburgh made public his approval for the ratification of the Equal Rights Amendment. During that decade, the organization Catholics Act for ERA sent out marketing materials on behalf of the amendment quoting support from Hesburgh.

President Jimmy Carter appointed Hesburgh to a blue-ribbon immigration reform commission in 1979; the commission's finding that any national immigration reform proposals can succeed only if the American national border is properly secured beforehand was cited by various opponents of illegal immigration to the United States. His efforts on the commission led to the passing of the Refugee Act of 1980, and the creation of a professional Asylum Corps in the 1990s.

Papal appointments
Hesburgh served as a permanent Holy See representative from 1956 to 1970 to the International Atomic Energy Agency in Vienna, Austria. Pope Paul VI appointed Hesburgh as head of the Vatican representatives attending the twentieth anniversary of the United Nations' human rights declaration in Tehran, Iran, and as a member of the Holy See's U.N. delegation in 1974. Pope John Paul II appointed Hesburgh to the Pontifical Council for Culture in 1983.

Business and nonprofit foundation leader
Throughout his career, Hesburgh was active on many advisory boards related to higher education, science, business, and civic affairs. He also traveled the world on behalf of the university and the organizations he served.

In the field of higher education, Hesburgh was a contributor to The Pursuit of Excellence (1958), an analysis of the U.S. education system that the Rockefeller Brothers Fund commissioned as part of its Special Studies Project. Hesburgh also served as a member of the International Federation of Catholic Universities, and as its president from 1963 to 1970; a board member and eventual president of the Association of American Colleges and Universities; a board member of the American Council on Education; and a board member of the Institute of International Education, among other education-related groups.

In 1990, during his retirement years, Hesburgh became the first priest to be elected to the Harvard Board of Overseers (board of directors), and served from 1994 to 1996 as the board's president. Hesburgh also served as co-chairman of the Knight Commission on Intercollegiate Athletics that made significant revisions to the regulation of American collegiate sports.

Hesburgh was involved with several science-related projects and organizations. From 1956 until 1970, he served as the permanent Vatican representative to the International Atomic Energy Agency in Vienna, Austria. In addition to serving on the U.S. National Science Board, Hesburgh was appointed U.S. ambassador to the 1979 United Nations Conference on Science and Technology for Development. He also served with the Midwestern Universities Research Association and the Nutrition Foundation Board. While serving on the board of the United States Institute of Peace, Hesburgh "helped organize a meeting of scientists and representative leaders of six faith traditions who called for the elimination of nuclear weapons."

Hesburgh was a board member of numerous business and civic organizations. From 1961 to 1982 he served on the board of the Rockefeller Foundation, and from 1977 to 1982 as board chairman. Hesburgh also served as a director for the Chase Manhattan Bank and a member of the advisory board of People for the American Way, among many other organizations.  Hesburgh's interest in international affairs also led to his service on numerous international commissions and humanitarian projects.

Later years

After his retirement as president of the University of Notre Dame in 1987, Hesburgh took a year off for travel and vacation. Upon his return, he came to campus to work each day at his new office on the thirteenth floor of the library that eventually bore his name, and wrote his autobiography, God, Country, Notre Dame: The Autobiography of Theodore M. Hesburgh (1990) with Jerry Reedy. The book spent six weeks on the New York Times best-seller list. At the conclusion of the book, Hesburgh remarked:

Hesburgh kept busy in his retirement years, which also included time to relax at the Holy Cross property at Land O' Lakes, Wisconsin. He wrote regularly, including a second book, Travels with Ted and Ned (1992), which received mixed reviews, and edited The Challenge and Promise of a Catholic University (1994), a collection of essays on Catholic higher education. Hesburgh continued to deliver speeches and lectures, as well as serving on numerous boards and committees, including his controversial decision in 1994 to co-chair the legal defense fund for President Bill Clinton and First Lady Hillary Clinton with former U.S. Attorney General Nicholas Katzenbach.

Hesburgh was especially active in the development of five institutions he organized: the Ecumenical Institute for Theology Studies at Tantur, Jerusalem; Notre Dame's Center for Civil and Human Rights; the Helen Kellogg Institute for International Studies; the Kroc Institute for International Peace Studies; and the Hank Family Environmental Research Center. Other retirement activities included co-chairing the Knight Commission with William C. "Bill" Friday, former president of the University of North Carolina, and joining the Harvard Board of Overseers in 1990. In 2009, he supported the invitation to Barack Obama to speak at Notre Dame, which was controversial because of Obama's strong endorsement of pro-choice legislation.

Death and legacy
 
Hesburgh died on February 26, 2015, at the age of 97. His death, funeral, and memorial service gained  widespread media attention. Attendees and speakers at the memorial service included former President Jimmy Carter, Condoleezza Rice, Lou Holtz, then cardinal Theodore McCarrick and cardinal Roger Mahony, former U.S. senator Harris L. Wofford, Indiana governor Mike Pence, former First Lady Rosalynn Carter, former U.S. senator Alan K. Simpson, U.S. senator Joe Donnelly, William G. Bowen, and a video message from President Barack Obama.

Hesburgh's leadership as president of the University of Notre Dame brought it to the forefront of American Catholic universities. A Time magazine cover story from February 9, 1962, named him as "the most influential figure in the reshaping of Catholic higher education in the U.S." Long known for its football program, Notre Dame also became known for its academics. Among his major accomplishments at Notre Dame, Hesburgh succeeded in transferring of ownership of Notre Dame from Holy Cross priests to the Notre Dame Board of Trustees in 1967. During his tenure as president, Notre Dame began admitting women, transforming the university into a coeducational institution in 1972. While Hesburgh was slow to recognize that Notre Dame's "policies and practices unintentionally produced unequal outcomes," he took decisive action after its minority students challenged him to do so. By the 1970s Notre Dame was a "much more diverse university than it had been ten years earlier."

The university has named several buildings, scholarships, and academic programs in his honor, including the Hesburgh Library, the Hesburgh Institute for International Studies, which Hesburgh founded in 1985, the Hesburgh-Yusko Scholarship, and the Hesburgh International Scholar Experience. Hesburgh's papers are housed in the Archives of the University of Notre Dame. Notre Dame's Hesburgh Library initially opened as the Memorial Library on September 18, 1963, and was renamed in his honor in 1987. In his retirement, Hesburgh maintained a private office on the library's thirteenth floor.

Hesburgh, one of the country's "most respected clergyman," was a strong supporter of interfaith dialogue. He also brought a Catholic perspective to the numerous government commissions, civic initiatives, and other projects in which he was involved. From his position within the American political establishment and as a major figure in the Catholic Church from the 1950s to the 1990s, he used his influence to urge support of political policies and legislation to help solve national problems.

Hesburgh remained an activist for most of his adult life, especially in the area of civil rights and equality. He played a significant role in national affairs, beginning in the mid-twentieth century, and became well known for his liberal point of view, which was based on concepts of freedom and autonomy. Hesburgh supported the peaceful use of atomic energy, aid to developing Third World countries (especially Africa and Latin America), and civil rights and equality. Although his remarks and actions were controversial at times, "he nearly always came through unscathed."

As a fifteen-year member of the U.S. Civil Rights Commission, Hesburgh took a public stand against racism and prejudice. He used his skills as a leader to forge strong alliances, even with those who held different political philosophies. For Hesburgh, civil rights were a moral issue, as he once declared:  While Hesburgh was criticized by some for his social and political ideas, many praised his "contributions to ecumenism, civil rights, and world peace"

In 2018, Hesburgh, a documentary film directed by Patrick Creadon, was released. It covers Hesburgh's life, particularly his presidency at Notre Dame.

Presidential appointments
 National Science Board (1954–56), Committee on International Science
 National War College, Board of Consultants
 Overseas Development Council (1971–82)
 President's Commission on All-Volunteer Armed Forces
 President's Committee on the Holocaust
 President's General Advisory Committee on Foreign Assistance Programs
 Presidential Clemency Board (1974–75)
 U.S. Advisory Committee on International Educational and Cultural Affairs (1962–65)
 U.S. Ambassador and Chair, U.S. Delegation to the United Nations Conference on Science and Technology for Development (1979)
 U.S. Commission on Civil Rights (1957–72)
 U.S. Commission on United States-Latin American Relations
 U.S. Institute of Peace, Board of Directors
 U.S. Naval Academy, Board of Visitors
 U.S. Official Observer Team for El Salvador Elections (1982)
 U.S. Select Commission on Immigration and Relief Policy (1979–81)
 U.S. State Department, Policy Planning Council

Selected published works

Books
 
 
 
 
 
 
  
 
 
 With Paul A. Miller and Clifton R. Wharton Jr., 
 
 
 With Jerry Reedy, 
 
 Editor,

Honors and awards

Hesburgh received numerous honors and awards for his public service. In 1964, President Johnson awarded Hesburgh the Medal of Freedom, the nation's highest civilian honor. In 2000, Hesburgh was awarded the Congressional Gold Medal, the first person from higher education to receive the honor.

On September 1, 2017, the United States Postal Service (USPS) released a First Class postage stamp honoring Hesburgh in the year of the 100th anniversary of his birthday. The release ceremony was held at the Joyce Center at the University of Notre Dame in Notre Dame, Indiana.

Hesburgh's awards include, among many others:
 Namesake of minor planet 1952 Hesburgh, discovered by the Indiana Asteroid Program (1952)
 Elected to the American Academy of Arts and Sciences (1960)
 Honorary member of the Austrian Catholic fraternity KÖHV Alpenland (1961)
 Presidential Medal of Freedom (1964)
 Alexander Meiklejohn Award (1970) from the American Association of University Professors
 Elected to the American Philosophical Society (1974)
 The Award for Greatest Public Service Benefiting the Disadvantaged, an annual award presented by Jefferson Awards (1976)
 Sylvanus Thayer Award from the United States Military Academy (1980)
 F. Sadlier Dinger Award by educational publisher William H. Sadlier, Inc. in recognition of his outstanding contributions to the ministry of religious education in America. (1982)
 Public Welfare Medal from the National Academy of Sciences (1984)
 Elected to the United States National Academy of Sciences (1984)
 Four Freedoms Award for the Freedom of Worship (1993) from the Roosevelt Institute
 Namesake of the TIAA–CREF's Hesburgh Award (1993)
 Blessed are the Peacemakers Award from Catholic Theological Union (1998)
 Indiana Living Legend (2001) award from the Indiana Historical Society
 NCAA Gerald R. Ford Award (2004 inaugural recipient) for leadership in intercollegiate athletics
 Awarded the Sagamore of the Wabash by the Governor of Indiana Mitch Daniels in 2006.
 Honorary U.S. Navy chaplain (2013)

World records
In a flight that took place on February 28, 1979, Hesburgh, one of a very few number of civilians to ride in a Lockheed SR-71 Blackbird, flew at Mach 3.35 (about 2,200 miles per hour) as a favor owed to him by President Jimmy Carter.

In 1982, after receiving his ninetieth honorary degree, Hesburgh's name was added to the Guinness Book of World Records as the individual with the "Most Honorary Degrees." As of 2013, he had received more than 150 honorary degrees.

Honorary degrees
Hesburgh is the recipient of more than 150 honorary degrees. These include:

See also

References

Further reading
 
 Miscamble, Wilson D. American Priest: The Ambitious Life and Conflicted Legacy of Notre Dame's Father Ted Hesburgh (2019) online

External links

 Biography from the University of Notre Dame
 
 Father Hesburgh and American Presidents

Remembering Father Hesburgh (South Bend Tribune special report section/article compilation)

1917 births
2015 deaths
American Roman Catholic priests
Catholic University of America alumni
Congregation of Holy Cross
Congressional Gold Medal recipients
Laetare Medal recipients
Members of the Pontifical Council for Culture
Pontifical Gregorian University alumni
Presidential Medal of Freedom recipients
Presidents of the University of Notre Dame
Religious leaders from Syracuse, New York
United States Commission on Civil Rights members
University of Notre Dame faculty
Writers from Indiana
Writers from Syracuse, New York
Members of the American Philosophical Society
Equal Rights Amendment activists